The 200th Pennsylvania House of Representatives District is located in Philadelphia County and includes the following areas:

 Ward 09
 Ward 22
 Ward 50

Representatives

References

Government of Philadelphia
200